The Cowboy and the Bandit is a 1935 American Western film directed by Albert Herman, starring Rex Lease, Bobby Nelson, and Blanche Mehaffey.

Cast
 Rex Lease as Bill
 Bobby Nelson as Bobbie [Barton]
 Blanche Mehaffey (credited as Janet Morgan) as Alice
 Dick Alexander as Scarface
 Adabelle Driver as Mother Alexander Barton
 Bill Patton as Whitey
 Hal Taliaferro (credited as Wally Wales) as Chuck
 William Desmond as Sheriff
 Franklyn Farnum as Dealer
 Art Mix as Luke Short

References

American black-and-white films
1935 films
1930s English-language films
1935 Western (genre) films
American Western (genre) films
Films directed by Albert Herman
1930s American films